Touman, from Old Chinese (220 B.C.E.): *do-mɑnᴬ, is the earliest named leader (chanyu) of the Xiongnu, reigning from .

Life

Competing with the Xiongnu for supremacy were the Dōnghú (東胡) or 'Eastern Barbarians' and the Yuezhi. In 215 BCE, Qin Shi Huang, the first emperor of China, sent a 300,000-strong army headed by General Meng Tian into the Ordos region and drove the Xiongnu northward for 1,000 li (about 416 km).

"Touman, unable to hold out against the Qin forces, had withdrawn to the far north, where he held out for over ten years."

After the death of the Chinese general Meng Tian in 210 BCE, Touman led the Xiongnu people to cross the Yellow River back to regain their previous territory.

The legend says, that Touman favored a younger son from another concubine. To get rid of his eldest son, Modu (冒頓), Touman sent him to the Yuezhi as a hostage, and then made a sudden attack on them. In retaliation the Yuezhi prepared to kill Modu, but he managed to steal a horse and escape back to the Xiongnu. Touman was impressed of his bravery and put Modu in command of a force of 10,000 horsemen. Modu was very successful in training his men to obey him absolutely. In 209 BCE, Modu commanded his men to shoot his father, killing him as well as his stepmother, younger brother, and the high officials who refused to take orders from him. Thereafter Modu became chanyu.

The Book of Han (juan 94's "upper" section) recounts the end of Touman's life in vivid language, as follows: 

...  The chanyu (Touman) had a son and heir called Modu.  Later, he had a beloved queen, who gave birth to a younger son.  Touman wanted to cast aside Modu to install the young son.  He managed to send Modu as a hostage to the Yuezhi.  Upon Modu having become a hostage, Touman quickly attacked the Yuezhi.  The Yuezhi wanted to kill Modu.  Modu stole their good horses, rode, went away, and returned home.  Touman took it as a show of strength and ordered that he have command of 10,000 riders.  Modu managed to make whistling arrowheads, and used them to train his riders to shoot.  He gave an order, saying: "Those who do not always shoot at something shot at by an arrow with a whistling arrowhead will be beheaded." He conducted hunting for game-animals. He had with him some who were not shooting at the things the whistling arrowhead(s) were shot at, and he beheaded them  on the spot. That being done, Modu, with a whistling arrowhead, shot at one of his own good horses.  At his left and his right, some did not dare to shoot at all.  Modu straightaway beheaded them.  [Next,] he waited, a while passed, and, again with a whistling arrowhead, he shot at his own beloved wife.  At his left and his right, there were some who were quite afraid, and did not dare shoot, and he again beheaded them. A while passed, and Modu went out hunting.  With a whistling arrowhead, he shot at one of the chanyu's good horses.  At [his] left and right, all shot at it.  Modu thereupon knew that his left and right could be used [for the task].  He went along, on a hunt of his father, the chanyu Touman, and shot at Touman with a whistling arrowhead. Those at his left and right, all following the whistling arrowhead, shot and killed Touman.  They put to death both his stepmother and the younger brother and even some important retainers who did not obey and go along.  Modu thereupon installed himself and became chanyu.

Footnotes

References
 Watson, Burton. (1993). Records of the Grand Historian by Sima Qian. Translated by Burton Watson. Revised Edition. Columbia University Press. .
 Beckwith, Christopher I. (2009): Empires of the Silk Road: A History of Central Eurasia from the Bronze Age to the Present. Princeton: Princeton University Press. .
 Yap, Joseph P. (2009). Wars With The Xiongnu, A Translation from Zizhi tongjian. AuthorHouse, Bloomington, Indiana, U.S.A. . Introduction and Chapter 2.
 Doerfer, Gerhard (1963-1975). Türkische und Mongolische Elemente im Neupersischen. 4 vols.  Wiesbaden: Franz Steiner. OCLC accession number 01543707 on Worldcat.org, where no ISBN found.
 Ban Gu 班固. (89 AD). Han shu 漢書.
 
 
 Steingass, Francis Joseph. (1892; Fifth Impression, 1963; ...). A Comprehensive Persian-English Dictionary.  London: Routledge & Kegan Paul Limited.

External links
 All Empires: The Xiongnu Empire

Xiongnu
Chanyus
3rd-century BC rulers in Asia
Founding monarchs
Leaders ousted by a coup

de:Teoman